is a passenger railway station located in the city of Himeji, Hyōgo Prefecture, Japan, operated by the private Sanyo Electric Railway.

Lines

Station layout
The station consists of two unnumbered ground-level side platforms connected by a footbridge. The station is unattended.

Platforms

Adjacent stations

|-
!colspan=5|Sanyo Electric Railway

History
Matogata Station opened on 19 August 1923.

The footbridge at the station was opened for operation in 1973.

Passenger statistics
In fiscal 2018, the station was used by an average of 1038 passengers daily (boarding passengers only).

Surrounding area
 Himeji City Hall Matogata Service Center
 Hachiya Jizo
Himeji Matogata Elementary School

See also
List of railway stations in Japan

References

External links

 Official website (Sanyo Electric Railway) 

Railway stations in Japan opened in 1923
Railway stations in Himeji